Rafael Lucio is a municipality  located in the montane central zone of the State of Veracruz, about 9 km from state capital Xalapa. It has a surface of 24.68 km2. By Decree of November 5, 1932 Rafael Lucio's municipality and the head-board is created they are named Rafael Lucio, in honor of the illustrious doctor of Xalapa.

Geographic limits

The municipality of Rafael Lucio is delimited to the north by Tlacolulan and Jilotepec, to the southeast by Banderilla,  to the south by Tlalnelhuayocan and to the west by Tres Valles.  It is watered by small tributaries of the Actopan River.

Agriculture

It produces principally maize.

Celebrations

In September the celebration honoring San Miguel Archangel, patron of the town, takes place, and in December there occurs the celebration in honor of Virgin of Guadalupe.

Weather

The weather in Rafael Lucio is cold and wet all year with rains in summer and autumn.

References

External links 

  Municipal Official webpage
  Municipal Official Information

Municipalities of Veracruz